The Battle of Hutong was a military conflict between the Tsardom of Russia and the Qing dynasty which occurred in the spring of 1654 on the Songhua River. Korean musketeers were also present from Joseon. It resulted in the retreat of Russian forces.

Background
In 1652, Qing troops led by Haise unsuccessfully attacked the Russian fort at Achansk. Two years later Qing forces returned and forced the Daur villages to relocate away from the Amur River into the valley of the Songhua River, depriving the Russians of provisions.

On 26 March 1654, 152 soldiers from Joseon under the leadership of Byeon Geup departed from Hoeryeong. They joined the Manchu forces at Ningguta after eight days of travelling.

Faced with depleting supplies, the Cossacks abandoned their fortresses and ventured into the inner Amur valley where they encountered the Qing-Joseon forces.

Battle
On 27 April 1654, Onufriy Stepanov and his men encountered the Qing-Joseon forces after sailing three days on the Songhua River. Stepanov had around 400 men and 39 ships while the Qing had 160 ships carrying roughly a thousand men. Despite the numerical disadvantage, the Russian ships were far larger than the opposing vessels, which were basically small boats. The largest ones could carry no more than 17 men. The two sides exchanged fire with the Russians winning out in the end. As the Russian forces chased after their fleeing enemies, they were ambushed by Korean musketeers entrenched on a hill overlooking the river. The Russians attempted to storm the Korean position, but fierce fusillades from the allied Manchu, Daur, and Korean forces inflicted heavy casualties, forcing them to retreat.

Aftermath
The Qing chased the Russian forces for three days, built an earthen fort on the Amur, and retreated to Ningguta by 13 June. Though diminished, Stepanov's forces continued to exert influence on the Amur for several years afterward. Anticipating another attack by the Qing, Stepanov rebuilt the Kamora fortress. On 16 February 1655, Qing commander Mingandali besieged Stepanov's forces. The Qing forces, 10,000 strong, failed to take the fortress and ran out of food, retreating the next month, but not before they had destroyed the Russian ships. At the same time, the Qing resettled the Daurs and Duchers to the Mudan River, depopulating the Amur region.

References

Bibliography
 .

 

17th-century conflicts
Military history of Manchuria
History of Siberia
History of Amur Oblast
Wars involving the Qing dynasty
Wars involving Russia
Wars involving Joseon
History of the Cossacks in Russia
17th-century military history of Russia
China–Russia military relations
Eight Banners